The following is list of golf courses in India.

References

See also 

 Golf Premier League
 List of cricket grounds in India
 List of stadiums in India
 List of international cricket grounds in India
 List of Field hockey venues in India
 List of football stadiums in India
 Venues of the 2010 Commonwealth Games

 
India
G
Lists of sports venues in India